Amport is a village and civil parish in the Test Valley district of Hampshire, England, a few miles west of Andover.   It incorporates the small hamlet of East Cholderton and has a population of about 1,200.

There is a village green is surrounded by thatched cottages. The village lies in the valley of the Pillhill Brook, a tributary of the River Anton and thence the River Test, a chalk stream famous for its trout-fishing, and for those who enjoy a country walk, there are many attractive routes.

Landmarks
Amport House on the outskirts of the village, which is now occupied by the tri-service chaplains’ school, was originally home to the Marquesses of Winchester; it has gardens designed by celebrated architect, Edwin Lutyens and laid out by Gertrude Jekyll. The House currently houses The Museum of Army Chaplaincy.

Amport's greatest attraction, however, is the world-renowned Hawk Conservancy where skilled falconers daily fly a wide variety of hawks, owls and eagles, including two American Bald Eagles.

Religious sites
The church, St Mary's, which was built in the fourteenth century, has a peal of six bells which are rung regularly. There is a church school, founded by a lady benefactor, Mrs Sophia Sheppard, the widow of Rev. Thomas Sheppard, in the early nineteenth century.

Education

State
Primary:
 Amport CE (Aided) Primary School

Notable people
Walter Davis (1847 – 1930), the Victorian plant collector was born in Amport, and started his career at Amport House.

References

External links
Amport Village

External links
 
 

Villages in Hampshire
Test Valley